The following is a list of Mongol consorts. This is list of the consorts of Mongol khagans.

Mongolian Empire

 Börte Khatun (1206–1227)
 Borogchin Khatun (1228–1240)
 Töregene Khatun (1240–1246)
 Oghul Qaimish (1246–1251)
 Qutugui Khatun (1251–1260)

Yuan dynasty

 Chabi (1260–1281), empress to Kublai Khan
 Nambui (1283–1294), empress to Kublai Khan
 Shirindari (1294–1305), empress to Temür Khan
 Bulugan (1295–1307), empress to Temür Khan
 Zhenge (1307–1311), empress to Külüg Khan
 Radnashiri (1313–1320), empress to Ayurbarwada Buyantu Khan
 Sugabala (1321–1323),  empress to Gegeen Khan
 Babukhan Khatun (1324–1328), empress to Yesün Temür Khan
 Budashiri (1328–1329), empress to Jayaatu Khan (first term)
 Babusha (1329–1329), empress to Khutughtu Khan
 Budashiri (1329–1332), empress to Jayaatu Khan (second term)
 Daliyetemishi (1332–1332), empress to Rinchinbal Khan
 Danashri (1333–1335), empress to Ukhaantu Khan
 Bayan Khutugh (1337–1365), empress to Ukhaantu Khan
 Empress Gi (1340–1370), empress to Ukhaantu Khan

Northern Yuan

 Ikh Habartu Jungen khatun
 Mandukhai Khatun
 Sutai taikhu
 Nagnan taikhu, origin name is Borjigin Namuzhong and is a descendant of Belgutei. Formerly a queen of Ligden khutugtu khan who later married Hong Taiji of the Qing dynasty emperor in 1635. Gave birth to two sons and one girl.
 Badamjav khatun, she married twice, first with Ligdan khan and later Hong taiji. 
 Erzhei taikhu
 Gurtumen ujin
 Boqi ujin

Mongolia (1911–24)

 Dondogdulam (1911–1923)
 Queen Genepil (1923–1924)

See also
List of Mongol rulers

References 

Mongol